Kollam Pooram (Malayalam : കൊല്ലം പൂരം) is a festival held each April in Kollam City in the Indian state of Kerala. The festival attracts large number of people from all parts of the state and is organised in connection with the annual festival of the Asramam Sri Krishnaswamy Temple at Kollam's Asramam Maidan. The festival has now assumed the status of a national festival attracting tourists in large numbers.

For the kudamattom, thirty elephants are split into two groups of fifteen representing the Thamarakulam Sri Mahaganapathy Temple and the Puthiyakavu Bhagawathy Temple. The kudamattom is held to the beats of a traditional melam. The pooram is followed by a firework display.
This year Pooram falls on Tuesday 16 April 2019.

Visit www.kollampooram.com for more details and live events

See also 
Website : https://kollampooram.com
 Kollam
 Thrissur Pooram
 President's Trophy Boat Race
 Kollam Beach

References

External links
Official government site of Kollam Pooram

Culture of Kollam
Hindu festivals in Kerala
Festivals in Kollam district
April observances
Elephant festivals in Kerala
Kollam district
Elephants in Indian culture